Malton is a neighbourhood in the northeastern part of the city of Mississauga, Ontario, Canada, located to the northwest of Toronto.

Malton is bounded by Highway 427 to the east, the Brampton city limits (a Canadian National Railway (CN) rail line) to the north, Airport Road to the west, and a second CN line and Toronto Pearson International Airport to the south. Malton is unique in that it does not adjoin any other Mississauga neighbourhood, being separated by the airport and extensive industrial areas.  All of the roads in this area are named after cities in the United Kingdom. Mimico Creek flows through Malton. The oldest portion of Malton is located on the northwest corner of Airport and Derry Roads.

Together, the Malton and Britannia Woods areas compose Ward 5.

History

1820–1936

The Second Purchase from the Mississauga Indians on Wednesday, October 28, 1818, was for 648,000 acres. Toronto Township received 34,556 acres, increasing its total acreage to 64,125. The Toronto Township expansion included Malton Village.

The village of Malton took up the east half of Lot 11, Concession 6, East of Hurontario Street (EHS). This was the 100-acre land grant of Joseph Price that was designated in 1821. Most sources say Malton was first settled in 1819 or 1820.

The northeast corner of Toronto Township was first settled in 1820 by Richard Halliday. There is no Halliday listed in the Land Registry papers, so he probably was a squatter and then rented, or his purchase was not registered. Halliday was the local blacksmith and innkeeper, and he named the settlement Malton, after his home in England, Malton, North Yorkshire.

Another early settler was Joseph Tomlinson. His land petition was dated August 25, 1819. He and his wife Mary came to Malton in August 1820 to claim his 100-acre land grant; the east half of Lot 10, Conc. 7.  Joseph built a cabin 16x20, cleared and fenced 5 acres, cleared the roadway in front of the property within 18 months to comply with the conditions of his land grant.

Other early settlers included:

Samuel and Margaret Shaw 1821 200 acres S half Lot 10, W half of Lot 11 Con. 8 
Henry and Elizabeth Brocklebank 1821 
Samuel Moore 1822. Samuel Moore was the son of John Moore who on April 3, 1822 purchased Robert Chamber's 100-acre grant; the West half of Lot 11, Con. 6  

In the 1840s, the Blanchard family cleared land northwest of the Four Corners and the area became the Village of Malton.

In 1850, when Toronto Township was incorporated, Malton had a population of 350.  The introduction of the Grand Trunk Railway in 1854, allowed better access to Toronto markets for local farmers and Malton thrived as a result. The village of Malton was subdivided in 1855. The population was 600 in 1864. Malton was chosen as the county seat in 1867, but Brampton contested the decision and was awarded the county seat a year later. Its economic prosperity declined, as did the population, to 200. The opportunity for advancement was dealt another blow when the Credit Valley Railway came to Dixie, Streetsville, Meadowvale and Churchville in 1879. Malton suffered with the drop in shipping business.

Malton was organized as a police village in 1914.

1937–1945

In 1937, Malton experienced a major shift from agricultural to an industrial economy when 13 farms were selected to become the location of a 'million dollar, world class airport' (now Toronto Pearson International Airport) and location for a new Aircraft manufacturing Industry.

In April 1937, Land agents representing the Toronto Harbour Commission approached the farmers of Malton who owned Lots 6-10 on Concession 5 and 6 to acquire land for Malton Airport. The farmers were: 
Mrs. Thomas Osborne - 100 acres (Conc. 6, Lot 10) - This farm was on the SW corner of Malton "Four Corners" - Airport (6th line) and Derry Roads
Robert H. Peacock - 100 acres (Conc. 6, Lot 9),
Frank Chapman - 100 acres (Conc. 6, Lot 8)
Rowland Estate - 100 acres (Conc. 6, Lot 7)
Frank Chapman - 50 acres (Conc. 6, Lot 6)
A. Schrieber - 100 acres (Conc. 5E, Lot 10)
W.A. Cripps - 200 acres (Conc. 5W, Lot 10)
Wilbur Martin - 100 acres (Conc. 5E, Lot 9)
David J. Lammy - 150 acres (Conc. 5W, Lot 9)
Mack Brett - 150 acres (Conc.5W, Lot 8,9)
John H. Perry - 100 acres (Conc. 5E, Lot 8)
Lydia Garbutt - 100 acres (Conc. 5W, Lot 8)
John Dempster - 100 acres (Conc. 5E, Lot 7)
Horace C. Death - 99 acres (Conc. 5E, Lot 6) - This farm was on the NE corner of Elmbank (Britannia) Road and 5th Line (Torbram Road), closest to the Village of Elmbank.

In 1937 the agreements were drawn up for a total purchase of 1410.8 acres (including 108 acres for National Steel Car and 243.73 for Department of National Defense).

Airport

The Chapman Farm house was the first airport terminal (1937). In 1939, a wooden terminal that was identical to the one built at Toronto City Centre Airport, replaced the Chapman Farm House as the airport terminal.

Malton Airport was also the site of the British Commonwealth Air Training Plan facilities during the war-time years.

Aircraft industry

National Steel Car built a manufacturing plant in 1938. It produced Westland Lysanders and was subcontractor for production of other aircraft. On November 4, 1942, the Federal government expropriated National Steel Car and set up the crown corporation called Victory Aircraft. Victory Aircraft produced Avro Lancaster bombers from 1942 to 1945.

Victory Village

In 1942, the Canadian Government expropriated the north part of the former Fred Codlin farm and built 200 military-style houses for war-time workers.  "Victory Village" streets had war-time references; Victory, McNaughton (Andrew McNaughton, commander of the Canadian Forces in the UK), Churchill and Lancaster (Avro Lancasters were built at Victory Aircraft from 1943 to 1945).
Victory Community Hall was built shortly after (at Victory Park) and was renovated in 2010.

There were two other streets in the Village, Anson Ave. & Merrit Ave.  Anson ran horizontally at the top of Lancaster.  Merrit ran behind Churchill Ave.

1945–1969
Originally on the border (Airport Road) between Toronto Gore and Toronto Townships, Malton became part of Toronto Township in 1952, following the annexation of that part of Toronto Gore south of Steeles Avenue.  When Toronto Township was erected into the Town of Mississauga in 1967, the Police Village of Malton was dissolved.  Mississauga became a city in 1974.

Airport

The Trans-Canada Airport terminal replaced the wooden terminal in 1949. The Trans-Canada Terminal was replaced by the Aeroquay Terminal in 1964.

Aircraft industry

A.V. Roe Canada Limited was established on December 1, 1945 and assumed control of Victory Aircraft. In 1946, A.V. Roe acquired Turbo Research Limited, which was later renamed Orenda Engines. On August 10, 1949, the Avro Jetliner made its first flight. On January 19, 1950 the CF-100 Jet Interceptor/Fighter made its maiden flight.

By 1958, Malton acquired an international reputation as a leader in aeronautical design and manufacturing. Malton was the home of the famous Avro Arrow, Canada's first supersonic aircraft, still believed to have been years ahead of its time. On February 20, 1959, Prime Minister John Diefenbaker terminated the project and the five completed Arrows were dismantled.
After the cancellation of the Avro Arrow program in 1959, the plant was operated by de Havilland Canada (1962), Douglas Aircraft (1965) McDonnell Douglas Canada (1981), and Boeing Canada (1997) before being demolished in 2005.

Housing

The Ridgewood subdivision was built in the mid-1950s. Ridgewood (Justine Drive, Capricorn Crescent, Michaud Avenue, Honeysuckle Avenue, Sonja Road, Minotola Avenue, Etude Drive, Lipomanis Drive (Cambrett) and Hermitage Road) was originally called "Malton Defence Homes Subdivision".

Marvin Heights subdivision was built in the late 1950s (Redstone Road, Homeside Gardens, Bonaventure Drive and Chinook Drive).

The Westwood subdivision was started in the mid-1960s (Morning Star Drive, Darcel Avenue, Dunrankin Drive). Laddie Crescent was established in 1967. Darla Drive, Discus Crescent, Lockington Crescent, Monica Drive, and Rockhill Road are listed on the 1968 Voter list 16242. Wrenwood Crescent and Yuma on 16243. Corliss Crescent, Darcel Avenue, Wyewood Road, Custer Crescent, Meyer Drive, Morningstar Drive, Bayswater Crescent, Madiera Road, Magic Court, Harwick Drive, Topping Road, Wainbrook Road, Dellaport Drive, Woodruff Crescent and Crabtree Crescent also appear on the 1968 Voter lists.

Gas explosion

On Saturday, October 25, 1969 at 2:55 PM a natural gas line leak caused an explosion and fire at the "Four Corners" (the intersection of Airport and Derry Road) of Malton. The "blowtorch" flame was 150 feet high and the heat was estimated to be 1500 degrees Fahrenheit. Consumer's Gas finally shut the gas off about 4 hours later.

The Avronian Restaurant, Langford's Variety, Malton Hardware and Baker's Lumber were blown apart. The fire consumed Pat's Steak on a Bun and Sit n' Eat restaurants and damaged the Bank of Nova Scotia, Malton Fruit Market (Longo's), Abell's Drug Store and Shirley's Pool Hall.

75-year-old Jean Perigo was killed instantly and 20 other people were injured. Two houses, 17 businesses and 49 cars were destroyed. 18 families who live in apartments above the stores were homeless. Over 350 families were evacuated. The total damage was estimated to be $1.5 million. Reconstruction took place over a 10-year period at a cost of $6.5 million. Some businesses re-opened and others closed permanently. The "Four Corners" of Malton never regained its former vitality.

1969–present

Aircraft industry

The office and manufacturing plant facilities, on the Southwest corner of Airport and Derry Road, that was built by National Steel Car 1938–1942, and subsequently used by Victory Aircraft (1942–1945), A.V. Roe Canada (1945), de Havilland Canada (1962), Douglas Aircraft (1965), McDonnell Douglas Canada (1981), and Boeing Canada (1997) was demolished in 2005.

Orenda Aerospace Division, Magellan Aerospace Corporation continues to operate at 3160 Derry Road east.

Mitsubishi Heavy Industry Canada Aerospace, Inc. (MHICA) celebrated their 10-year anniversary in May, 2016. MHICA is a recognized North American Tier 1 heavy aerostructure manufacturer.

Airport and transportation

In addition to the airport, Malton has great importance as a transportation link between Toronto and its suburbs to the west, particularly Brampton and the other parts of Mississauga. Among other things, the tiny neighbourhood borders the airport, Brampton, Vaughan and Etobicoke. As such, it is very strategically placed and important to the flow of people and goods throughout the Greater Toronto Area.

Police

Law enforcement in Malton is provided by the Peel Regional Police.
There is a police buildings in the local mall.

Demographics

The post-war period saw waves of Italian and Polish immigrants settle in Malton, while the 1970s and 80s saw this shift to the South Asian and Caribbean population, who continue to make up the predominant demographic in Malton today.
Malton's proximity to Pearson International Airport, originally Malton Airport, is often cited as part of the reason it has become a popular initial place of settlement for immigrants, contributing to the tremendous population growth that has occurred from the 1950s onward.

Sports

Hockey
The Malton Minor Hockey Association MMHA was founded in 1949. Malton Arena was built in 1968. The arena was renamed Paul Coffey Arena on September 23, 2016. The MMHA became defunct in 2005.

Lacrosse
Malton Renegades ran a very successful minor lacrosse program however it also folded in 1982 when they joined with Erindale, Cawthra to form Mississauga Minor lacrosse. Clarkson, the last remaining separate minor club within the City limits would also join in the late 80's. A Jr "C" team also played out of the Malton Arena for a number of years.

Education

Public schools
Malton is served by the Peel District School Board, which operates secular English-language public schools. The Conseil scolaire Viamonde operates regional French-language secular public schools.

Elementary and middle schools
Brandon Gate Public School
Corliss Public School
Darcel Avenue Senior Public School (formerly Darcel Senior Public School)
Dunrankin Drive Public School (formerly Westwood Public School)
Lancaster Public School (formerly Lancaster Senior Public School)
Marvin Heights Public School
Morning Star Middle School (formerly Morning Star Secondary School)
Ridgewood Public School

Secondary school
Lincoln M. Alexander Secondary School (formerly Westwood Secondary School), located across the road from Malton's branch of the Mississauga Library system, near Westwood Mall and the adjacent bus terminal

Catholic schools
Malton's Catholic community is served by the Dufferin-Peel Catholic School Board, which operates English-language Catholic schools. The Conseil scolaire de district catholique Centre-Sud operates regional French-language Catholic schools.

Ascension of Our Lord Secondary School was originally built as a Junior High, but is now Malton's only Catholic high school. Formerly there were also several primary schools, of which two are left.
Holy Cross Separate School is located next to Our Lady of The Airways Catholic Church. When St. Gabriel was closed in 2004, the remaining students were incorporated into Holy Cross and the school was reopened as an Adult Learning Centre.
St. Raphael Elementary School is located at the north end of Woodgreen Park. Students from St. Michael (closed in 2003) and Our Lady of the Airways (closed in 2004) were transferred to St. Raphael's. The St. Michael's building was torn down, and Our Lady of the Airways was demolished in 2009.

Development
As of 2010, a new bus terminal was built on the corner of Morning Star Dr. and Goreway Dr. An overbridge at railway crossing on Torbram Drive has been started and will soon begin construction. Malton Route 107 travel times have been reduced since the completion of the Mississauga Bus Rapid Transit (BRT) transitway.

There is one new pools at the community centre, there used to be one in the high school but as of 2022 it is being turned into a new youth hub, (Malton Youth Hub). There are two new ambulance stations on either side of Malton and one new fire hall.

Notable people

 Charles Allen, Olympic hurdler.
 Greg Anaka, recipient of the Order of Canada in 1974; president of Malton Memorial Recreation Association.
 Carlton Chambers, Olympic gold medalist.
 Paul Coffey, NHL defenceman and member of Hockey Hall of Fame.
 Devon, winner of the 1993 Juno award for Best Rap Recording.
 Richard Dos Ramos, jockey; grew up in Malton.
 Sherman Hamilton, former NCAA and Canadian National Basketball Team player.
 Teddy Morris, Canadian Football Hall of Fame player and coach for the Toronto Argonauts; retired to his farm in Malton.
 Michael Peca, former captain of the Buffalo Sabres of the NHL.
 Chris Rudge, chief executive officer of the Canadian Olympic Committee (COC) 2003–2010, chairman and CEO 100th Grey Cup Festival (2012), executive chairman & CEO of Toronto Argonauts Football Club.
 Paul Stalteri, professional soccer player with the Tottenham Hotspur in the English Premiership. Played for the Malton Bullets.
 George Stroumboulopoulos, host of CBC Television's The Hour.

References

External links 
Malton Neighbourhood Services
Heritage Mississauga - Malton 
History of Malton, Ontario
Peel District School Board Schools in Ward 5
Dufferin-Peel Catholic School Board

Neighbourhoods in Mississauga